Jacob Thorkelson (September 24, 1876 – November 20, 1945) was a Norwegian American politician from the state of Montana who served as the United States Congressman from Montana's 1st congressional district from January 3, 1939 to January 3, 1941.

Biography
Thorkelson was born in Egersund, a coastal town in the county of Rogaland, Norway. Thorkelson immigrated to the United States in 1892; he studied nautical navigation, and later worked as navigator and sailing master on ocean-going ships. He graduated from the College of Physicians and Surgeons at the University of Maryland, Baltimore in 1911, and served as a member of the faculty from 1911 until 1913.

In 1913, Thorkelson moved to Montana. He practiced medicine while residing successively in Dillon, Warm Springs, and Butte.

Military service
Thorkelson served with the Virginia Naval Reserve, a militia organization, from 1897 to 1899. He was also in the United States Navy Reserve from 1936 until 1939, and attained the rank of lieutenant commander.

Political career
In 1938, he was elected to the United States House of Representatives from Montana's 1st congressional district as a Republican, defeating incumbent Democratic Congressman Jerry J. O'Connell in the general election. Thorkelson was labeled as "rabidly pro-fascist and antisemitic" and "Jew-baiting, fascist-minded" by contemporary journalists for his use of the Congressional Record to reprint anti-British and anti-Jewish propaganda and his support for retired General George Van Horn Moseley. Thorkelson was opposed to the United States accepting more Jewish refugees. He claimed that Jewish migrants were part of an "invisible government" which was tied to the "communistic Jew" and "Jewish international financiers."

Commentator Walter Winchell called Thorkelson "the mouthpiece of the Nazi movement in congress". Thorkelson later sued Winchell for $1.8 million after being included by Winchell as one of a list of "Americans We Can Do Without". During his time in Congress, Thorkelson mailed 5000 copies of a friendly, sympathetic interview with Nazi agent George Sylvester Viereck.

Modern historians have described Thorkelson as "best known for his diatribes against Jews and the New Deal and for his calls to revise the United States Constitution" and "a raging anti-Semite and pro-fascist". Thorkelson inserted into the Congressional Record quotations from the Protocols of the Elders of Zion, from World Hoax by Ernest Fredrick Elmhurst, from blackshirt Sir Oswald Mosley's Action, from Los Angeles based Nazi-leaning publication Christian Free Press; and defended himself by saying:

When he ran for re-election in 1940, he was defeated in the Republican primary by former United States Congresswoman Jeannette Rankin. Following his defeat, he ran for the United States Senate in 1942, but came third in the primary to Wellington D. Rankin and Charles R. Dawley. He ran for Governor of Montana in 1944 against incumbent Governor Sam C. Ford, but lost to Ford in a landslide.

Death and burial
Thorkelson died from heart ailments in Butte on November 20, 1945, and was buried at Holy Cross Cemetery in Butte.

References

External links

1876 births
1945 deaths
20th-century American politicians
Physicians from Montana
Norwegian emigrants to the United States
People from Egersund
American anti-communists
American collaborators with Nazi Germany
American fascists
Politicians from Butte, Montana
Republican Party members of the United States House of Representatives from Montana
Old Right (United States)
United States Navy officers
United States Navy reservists
University of Maryland School of Medicine alumni
20th-century far-right politicians in the United States
Antisemitism in the United States